The David Crighton Medal is an honorific medal awarded to mathematicians.

The Institute of Mathematics and its Applications (IMA) and the London Mathematical Society (LMS) instituted the medal in 2002 in honour of the British mathematician David Crighton FRS (1942–2000). The award is made biennially, and was first presented in 2003.

Holders of the medal include Frank Kelly, Peter Neumann, Keith Moffatt, Christopher Zeeman, John Ball, David Abrahams and Arieh Iserles.

See also

 List of mathematics awards

References

External links
 David Crighton Medal web page

2002 establishments in the United Kingdom
Awards established in 2002

Awards of the London Mathematical Society